The Boyne-class ships of the line of 1810 were a class of two 98-gun second rates, built to the draught of .

Ships

Builder: Portsmouth Dockyard
Ordered: 25 June 1801
Launched: 3 July 1810
Fate: Broken up, 1861

Builder: Plymouth Dockyard
Ordered: 13 July 1801
Launched: 15 November 1811
Fate: Broken up, 1833

References

Lavery, Brian (2003) The Ship of the Line - Volume 1: The development of the battlefleet 1650-1850. Conway Maritime Press. .

 
Ship of the line classes